The Arab Organization for Standardization and Metrology, also known as Arab Organization for Standardization and Measures, was founded in 1965 as a specialized agency under the Arab League by the Council of Arab Economic Unity.

The organization's functions included offering technical advice to Arab states on systems of weights and measures; providing professional training and research on industrial production quality, metrology, test and inspection methods; and seeking standardization of technical terms and product specifications between member nations. Their first general committee was held on March 25, 1968.

The organization was merged in the 1990s with other organizations to form the Arab Industrial Development and Mining Organization.

Standards 
ASMO 449
ASMO 708

References

External links 
 Arab Organization for Standardization and Metrology on WorldCat, partial list of publications by the organization.
 Whatever happened to ASMO, anyway?

ISO member bodies
Scientific organizations established in 1965
Metrology organizations
Scientific organizations disestablished in 1989
Arab League
Arab organizations